Nemanja Tekijaški (born 2 March 1997) is a Serbian professional footballer who plays as a centre-back for Bruk-Bet Termalica Nieciecza.

Club career

Železničar Pančevo
Tekijaški came through Dinamo Pančevo youth system and was a part of the club's academy until summer 2014. On 8 August, same year, he joined the local club Železničar, who appeared in the Banat Zone League. After the club won the competition, and promoted to the Serbian League Vojvodina, Tekijaški took a place in the first squad for the 2015–16 campaign. During the season, he made 24 league matches, scoring a single goal for the club. Similar to the previous season, Tekijaški scored once time on 27 matches in the 2016–17 campaign. For the rest of 2017, Tekijaški played with the club in the first half of the 2017–18 season, scoring two goals in victories over Dunav Stari Banovci and Radnički Sremska Mitrovica, when he was also elected for the man of the match.

Spartak Subotica
Tekijaški joined Spartak Subotica at the beginning of 2018, after which he signed a -year deal with the club on 17 January same year. Tekijaški made his Serbian SuperLiga debut for new club on 16 February 2018, replacing injured Nemanja Ćalasan in 41 minute of the match against Napredak Kruševac.

Career statistics

Personal life
Born in Pančevo, Tekijaški finished Gymnasium in his hometown. Beside the football career, he is a student at the University of Belgrade Faculty of Law.

References

External links
 
 
 

1997 births
Living people
Sportspeople from Pančevo
Association football central defenders
Serbian footballers
Serbian expatriate footballers
FK Spartak Subotica players
Bruk-Bet Termalica Nieciecza players
Serbian SuperLiga players
Ekstraklasa players
FK Železničar Pančevo players
Serbian expatriate sportspeople in Poland
Expatriate footballers in Poland